The Jiujiang Yangtze River Bridge is a combined road-rail bridge over the Yangtze River near the city of Jiujiang, Jiangxi Province in eastern China. It links Xunyang District of Jiujiang, south of the river, with Xiaochi Town in Huangmei County, Hubei Province, to the north. The double deck bridge carries four vehicular lanes and two sidewalks on the top deck and two railway tracks on the bottom deck.

History
Construction of the Jiujiang Yangtze River Bridge began in 1973 but due to work stoppages, the bridge was not completed until 1993. In November 2011, a crack was discovered in the bridge's steel structure and forced the authorities to close the bridge to freight traffic.

See also
Yangtze River bridges and tunnels

References

External links

 (info about bridge)

Bridges over the Yangtze River
Arch bridges in China
Bridges in Hubei
Bridges in Jiangxi
Jiujiang
Bridges completed in 1993
Road-rail bridges in China
Double-decker bridges
1993 establishments in China